Robert Francis Kerkovich (born August 11, 1979 in Springfield, Massachusetts) is an American television and film actor, known for his work as the character Forensic Agent Sebastian Lund on the television series NCIS: New Orleans. He has also appeared in films Cloverfield, The Rebound, and Still Waiting....
He now plays in the Glass Cannon Podcast's Call of Cthulhu series "Time for Chaos."

Filmography

Film

Television

References

External links
 

1979 births
Living people
American male television actors
American male film actors
21st-century American male actors